La cagaste... Burt Lancaster (the Spanish for "You screwed it up... Burt Lancaster") is the second studio album by Spanish rock band Hombres G, released in 1986.

History
Hombres G entered TRAK studios in February 1986 to record their second studio album, La cagaste... Burt Lancaster.  They recovered the song "Marta tiene un marcapasos" from the Lollipop singles and released a new version which became a top hit.

Track listing

Personnel 

 David Summers – vocals, bass
 Rafa Gutiérrez – guitar
 Daniel Mezquita – guitar
 Javier Molina – drums

References

External links
 Official website
 Discography

1986 albums
Hombres G albums